The Qualcomm MSM Interface is a proprietary interface for interacting with Qualcomm baseband processors and is a replacement for the legacy cellular extensions of the Hayes command set. With mobile chipsets, communication between the application processor and the baseband processor happens through shared memory. On PCs with data cards, QMI is exposed through USB.

Linux 
In the Linux kernel, QMI can be used through two mutually exclusive drivers: GobiNet and qmi_wwan. These two drivers take completely different approaches to handle the protocol. GobiNet is a complex driver which implements within the kernel most of the core protocol logic, while qmi_wwan leaves all those 
tasks to user-space processes, and therefore keeping the kernel driver as small as possible. There are several userspace implementations, such as uqmi on OpenWrt, oFono and libqmi

See also 
 Radio Interface Layer

References 

Modems
Qualcomm